The Singer is the sixth studio album by Australian pop singer John Paul Young, released in August 1981. It was the first album by Young on Hammard Records. Featuring cover versions of 1960s pop and rock songs, the album peaked at number 98 on the Australian Kent Music Report.  "Out of Time" was released as the album's first single.

Track listing 
Side one

Side two

Charts

Personnel 
John Paul Young - Vocals
Jim Doyle, Stuart Fraser (Guitar)
Les Young (Bass)
Rex Bullen (Keyboards)
Russell Dunlop (Drums, percussion, synthesizer)
Ralph White (Horns)
Geoff Oates (Saxophone)
Karen Smith, Russell Dunlop (Backing Vocals)

References

John Paul Young albums
1981 albums
Covers albums